Malte Søstrup Setkov (born 14 January 1999) is a Danish ice hockey defenceman who is currently playing for the AIK IF of the HockeyAllsvenskan (Allsv). Setkov was selected by the Detroit Red Wings in the fourth round, 100th overall, of the 2017 NHL Entry Draft.

Playing career
As a youth in his native Denmark, Setkov played with Rødovre SIK before moving to Sweden as a 15-year old to continue his development within the Malmö Redhawks organization. He was the first Dane blueliner selected in the 2017 NHL Entry Draft, taken by the Detroit Red Wings in the fourth round, 100th overall.

He made his professional debut in the 2017–18 season, appearing scoreless in a solitary game and was signed to a two-year contract extension on December 11, 2017.

Career statistics

Regular season and playoffs

International

References

External links
 

1999 births
Living people
AIK IF players
Danish ice hockey defencemen
Detroit Red Wings draft picks
Kristianstads IK players
Malmö Redhawks players
People from Rødovre
Sportspeople from the Capital Region of Denmark